Face Off, Part II is the eighth solo studio album by American rapper Pastor Troy. It was released on March 1, 2005 through Money & Power Records, serving as a sequel to his 2001 album Face Off. Production was handled by Blaze, Cooley C, DJ Squeeky, Donnie Scantz, Drumma Boy, Enigma, J, KLC, Mo Chedda Productions, Swisso, and Pastor Troy himself. It features guest appearances from Little Pere, Mr. Gary, Pimpin Ken and Sky. The album peaked at number 112 on the Billboard 200, number 18 on the Top R&B/Hip-Hop Albums, number 8 on the Top Rap Albums, and number four on the Independent Albums in the United States.

Track list

Charts

References

2005 albums
Sequel albums
Pastor Troy albums
Albums produced by Drumma Boy